The Musée Jean de La Fontaine is a writer's house museum located in Château-Thierry, France.
It is housed in the former house of Jean de La Fontaine, a French fabulist, and is mostly dedicated to collections and objects representing Jean de La Fontaine's work.

History 
Fontaine was born and raised in the house which would later become the museum. He sold the house in 1676.

References

Art museums and galleries in France
Art museums established in 1876
Literary museums in France
Poetry museums
Museums in Aisne
1876 establishments in France
Maisons des Illustres